White Lake is a Canadian documentary film, directed by Colin Browne and released in 1989. The film centres on Browne's own family history, through the lens of a family reunion at a retreat in White Lake, British Columbia.

The film premiered at the 1989 Festival of Festivals. It was later screened at the 1989 Festival of the Arts in Ottawa, and at the 1989 Vancouver International Film Festival.

The film received a Genie Award nomination for Best Feature Length Documentary at the 11th Genie Awards in 1990.

References

External links
 

1989 films
1989 documentary films
Canadian documentary films
Films shot in British Columbia
English-language Canadian films
Documentary films about families
1980s English-language films
1980s Canadian films